Azimganj Junction is a railway station on the Barharwa–Azimganj–Katwa loop and is located in Murshidabad district lying west of Bhagirathi, a part of the Hooghly river in the Indian state of West Bengal. It serves Jiaganj Azimganj municipality.

History

In 1863, the Indian Branch Railway Company, a private company opened the Nalhati–Azimganj branch line. The  track was initially a  gauge line. The track was subsequently converted to  broad gauge.  The Indian Branch Railway Company was purchased by the Government of India in 1872 and the line was renamed Nalhati State Railway. It became a part of the East Indian Railway Company in 1892.

In 1913, the Hooghly–Katwa Railway constructed a line from Bandel to Katwa, and the Barharwa–Azimganj–Katwa Railway constructed the Barharwa–Azimganj–Katwa loop line.

With the construction of the Farakka Barrage and opening of the railway bridge in 1971, the railway communication picture of the area completely changed. Azimganj junction emerged as an important station in the links to New Jalpaiguri.

Major trains

Some of the important trains that runs from Azimganj junction  are :

 Howrah–Malda Town InterCity Express (via Azimganj)
 Kamakhya–Puri Weekly Express
 Howrah–Azimganj Kavi Guru Express
 Teesta Torsha Express
 Ganadevata Express
 Hatey Bazare Express
 Kolkata–Radhikapur Express
 Paharia Express
 Katihar–Howrah Weekly Express
 Teesta–Torsa Link Express
 Nabadwip Dham–Malda Town Express
 Kamrup Express
 Howrah–Balurghat Express
 Kolkata–Guwahati Garib Rath Express
 Dibrugarh–Kolkata Chitpur Express

References

External links
 Trains at Azimganj

Railway stations in Murshidabad district
Railway stations opened in 1863
Howrah railway division
Railway junction stations in West Bengal